The Tarantulas  are a surf guitar / rockabilly / punk  band. The Tarantulas Formed in 1995 in Orlando, Florida, with Randy J Shams (also known as a film composer) on guitar and  Chris Valentino on drums.

Early history 
In the early 1990s, guitarist Randy J was performing as a solo guitarist at local coffee houses and bars in Orlando. Chris Valentino, who was already gaining a reputation as an experienced percussionist and jazz drummer, would sit in on drums and the two musicians would improvise on instrumentals during live shows.

The experimental elements of the music gradually became a backdrop for pure traditional surf guitar melodies in the style of The Lively Ones, Link Wray, Dick Dale, and The Ventures. In August 1993 Randy J began performing under The Tarantulas name and by 1995 The two musicians found a bassist, Loran Lea, to round out the band, and the trio continued performing as The Tarantulas.

Monster Wave era 

In 1998, Ken Baugh joined The Tarantulas on bass and recorded with the band on "Monster Wave 100 Feet High". Ken was already known as a surf guitarist with his own band, the Ten Penny Heroes. The band continued performing shows at the House of Blues in Orlando, opening shows for Link Wray, and performing shows with The Friends of Dean Martinez and Dick Dale.

The trio released Monster Wave 100 Feet High in 1999 followed by Bandidos De Rojos in 2000.

Current recordings  
The Tarantulas Greatest Hits..or ... The Big Sellout was released in 2004, and Don't Murder Anyone ... Listen to the Lovebeats in June 2006.

They feature drummer Eddy Barattini, vocalist Kelly Cole, and early Tarantula tracks from the original lineup in the mid-1990s.

In 2011, The Tarantulas released the singles "Love in a Haystack" and "Summertime Girl". The current members for touring and recording are Randy J on guitar and vocals, Bill Juharos on drums, and Udi Cohen on bass.

The band is currently located in Arizona and Florida. The pop-punk album "13 Bites" was released in October 2019. The surf album "Surf 101" is scheduled for release in 2019.

Loran Lea 
The Tarantulas original bassist, Loran Lea, died in an auto accident on January 27, 2013.

Loran played with The Tarantulas from 1995-1998. He appeared on the 1996 Tarantulas EP recorded at Full Sail University (Orlando) and on the 1997 Tarantulas EP recorded at Audio Playground (Winter Park). 
The songs on the first EP were: Shark Attack, Lonerider, and Demolition in Death Valley. 
The songs on the second EP were: Third Break from the Shore, Freakazoid Mind Warp, and Death Zone. Loran also appeared on the first live recorded version of "Bandidos de Rojos" in 1997. 
 
Following the Tarantulas, Loran played bass for the band "Red", a popular Florida band based in Orlando. Loran was considered by many to be an excellent musician and extremely talented bassist. He died at age 40.

Trademark 
The Tarantulas is a registered trademark through the United States Patent and Trademark Office. Shams has acted against other bands with the word "Tarantulas" or "Tarantula" in their names, threatening legal action unless they change them.

Discography

Albums
EP Self Titled (1996) Tarantulas
EP Third Break (1997) Tarantulas
Monster Wave...100 Feet High (1999), Richter/Tarantulas
Bandidos De Rojos (2000) Tarantulas
Tarantula's Greatest Hits or...The Big Sellout (2004), Tarantulas
Don't Murder Anyone...Listen to the Lovebeats (2006)   Tarantulas
13 Bites (2019) Tarantulas
Surf 101 (2020) Tarantulas

References 

Rock music groups from Florida
Surf music groups
Musical groups from Orlando, Florida
Musical groups established in 1995